Hemi Takatou Taylor (born 17 December 1963) is a former international Wales rugby union player. A back row forward, he was part of the Wales squad for the 1995 Rugby World Cup. He is a cousin of former Australian squash player Danielle Drady.

Notes

Living people
1963 births
Welsh rugby union players
Wales international rugby union players
Rugby union flankers
Cardiff RFC players
Penarth RFC players
People from Morrinsville
Rugby union players from Waikato
Naturalised citizens of the United Kingdom